François Catonné is a French cinematographer. He won the 1993 César Award for Best Cinematography  for his work on Indochine. In 2011, he met the painter Vladimir Veličković with whom he decided to make a film. Since then, he has been making documentaries about painters with the principle of filming only in the artist's studio and showing him at work. He has already made ten and continues this work.

Selected filmography

External links
 
 François Catonné, AFC

Year of birth missing (living people)
Living people
French cinematographers
César Award winners